is a Prefectural Natural Park in Saga Prefecture, Japan. Established in 1952, the park spans the municipalities of Kashima and Tara.

See also
 National Parks of Japan
 Taradake Prefectural Natural Park (Nagasaki)

References

Parks and gardens in Saga Prefecture
Protected areas established in 1952
1952 establishments in Japan